Philibert Jacques Melotte (29 January 1880 – 30 March 1961) was a British astronomer whose parents emigrated from Belgium.

In 1908 he discovered a moon of Jupiter, today known as Pasiphaë. It was simply designated "Jupiter VIII" and was not given its present name until 1975. The outer main-belt asteroid 676 Melitta, the only asteroid he discovered, is named after the Attic form of the Greek Melissa, the bee, but its resemblance to the discoverer's name is not fortuitous.

The conspicuous star cluster in the Coma Berenices constellation is commonly designated Mel 111 since it appeared in Melotte's 1915 catalogue of star clusters, but not in Charles Messier's famous catalogue of deep sky objects or in the New General Catalogue since it was not proved to be a true cluster until 1938 by the astronomer R J Trumpler.

Melotte was awarded the Jackson-Gwilt Medal of the Royal Astronomical Society in 1909. A collection of his papers is held at Cambridge University Library.

See also
List of astronomical catalogues
Collinder catalogue - a similar catalogue of open star clusters published by Per Collinder in 1931.

References

External links 
 The Melotte Catalogue of Star Clusters
 RGO 74: Papers of Philippe Jacques Melotte

1880 births
1961 deaths
20th-century British astronomers
British people of Belgian descent
Discoverers of asteroids
Discoverers of moons